Roland Storme (born 25 January 1934) was a Belgian football player who won the Belgian Golden Shoe in 1958 while at K.A.A. Gent.  He played his debut in the national team the same year in a friendly win to Switzerland.  Until 1962 Storme played 10 times for Belgium.  In the early 1960s, he moved to Club Brugge.

Career
Born in Roeselare, Storme began playing football with local side S.K. Roeselare. At age 17, he signed for K.A.A. Gent, the second most expensive transfer in Belgian football history at the time. The Belgian First Division was not fully professional at the time, so Storme worked in his parents' business and for a coal company while training with Gent in the evenings.

After impressing during an international match against France, Storme was scouted by Atletico Madrid, but Gent refused their approach. Consequently, Club Brugge manager Norberto Höfling was able to bring Storme to the club in 1960. After four seasons with Brugge, he returned to Gent for one season before finishing his career in the lower levels of Belgian football with Wervik, Eeklo, S.K. Roeselare and Doornik.

References

External links

1934 births
Living people
Belgian footballers
Belgium international footballers
K.S.V. Roeselare players
K.A.A. Gent players
Club Brugge KV players
Belgian football managers
K.A.A. Gent managers
Association football defenders
People from Roeselare
Footballers from West Flanders